Spihumonesty is an album by Muhal Richard Abrams which was released on the Italian Black Saint label in 1979 and features performances by Abrams, George Lewis, Roscoe Mitchell, Amina Claudine Myers, Youseff Yancy and Leonard Jones with vocals by Jay Clayton.

Reception
The Penguin Guide to Jazz awarded the album 3 stars stating "This drummerless band moves through the charts like information through a printed circuit, and there is an impressive simultaneity to some of the cues which suggests that at least that some of this music was predetermined and meticulously rehearsed". The Rolling Stone Jazz Record Guide said "what should be a good band doesn't come up with much".

Track listing
All compositions by Muhal Richard Abrams
 "Triverse" - 6:01  
 "Inneroutersight" - 4:51  
 "Unichange" - 8:44  
 "Spihumonesty" - 6:23

Personnel
Muhal Richard Abrams: piano, synthesizer
Roscoe Mitchell: alto saxophone, flute
George Lewis: trombone, synthesizer, sousaphone
Leonard Jones: bass
Amina Claudine Myers: piano, organ, electric piano
Youseff Yancy: theremin
Jay Clayton: vocals

References

1979 albums
Muhal Richard Abrams albums
Black Saint/Soul Note albums